Lester Kasai (skateboarder) (born August 12, 1966) grew up in Anaheim, California. He began skating at a young age and was one of the original "Sadlands" team skateboard riders. He was one of the top Pro Skateboarders that dominated the Skate City Skatepark, in Whittier, California for many years.  Lester was one of the super stylish big air innovators of the 80's. The Sims "Lester" pro model skateboard was immensely popular.

Lester Kasai emerged as one of the top competitors of vert riding alongside such pros as Steve Caballero, Mike McGill, Christian Hosoi, and Mark "Gator" Rogowski.

The Madonna grab, invented by Tony Hawk, was named by Tony Hawk and Lester Kasai.

Lester Kasai was the second person to do a McTwist a few days after Mike McGill.  He wrecked himself on one shortly after and then quit doing them.

Invented tricks 

Benihana
Poliki

See also 

Christian Hosoi
Grabs (skateboarding)

References

External links 

Lester Kasai on Myspace
Lester Kasai on Myspace

1966 births
Living people
American skateboarders